The Canton of Buchy is a former canton situated in the Seine-Maritime département and in the Haute-Normandie region of northern France. It was disbanded following the French canton reorganisation which came into effect in March 2015. It consisted of 21 communes, which joined the canton of Le Mesnil-Esnard in 2015. It had a total of 10,781 inhabitants (2012).

Geography 
A farming area in the arrondissement of Rouen, centred on the town of Buchy.

The canton comprised 21 communes:

Bierville
Blainville-Crevon
Bois-Guilbert
Bois-Héroult
Boissay
Bosc-Bordel
Bosc-Édeline
Bosc-Roger-sur-Buchy
Buchy
Catenay
Ernemont-sur-Buchy
Estouteville-Écalles
Héronchelles
Longuerue
Morgny-la-Pommeraye
Pierreval
Rebets
Saint-Aignan-sur-Ry
Sainte-Croix-sur-Buchy
Saint-Germain-des-Essourts
Vieux-Manoir

Population

See also 
 Arrondissements of the Seine-Maritime department
 Cantons of the Seine-Maritime department
 Communes of the Seine-Maritime department

References

Buchy
2015 disestablishments in France
States and territories disestablished in 2015